1,2,3,3,3-Pentafluoropropene is the unsaturated fluorocarbon with the formula HFC=C(F)CF.  This colorless gas is of interest as a precursor to hydrofluoroolefins (HFOs), which are used as refrigerants in air conditioners.  Of the methods reported for its synthesis, one route involves dehydrofluorination of 1,1,2,3,3,3-hexafluoropropane.  The compound exists as a mixture of E- and Z-isomers.

References

Haloalkenes
Refrigerants
Trifluoromethyl compounds